Ardie Ray Copas (29 August 1950 – 12 May 1970) was a U.S. Army veteran of the Vietnam war, and a recipient of the Medal of Honor.

Biography 
Copas was born in Fort Pierce, Florida. He joined the U.S. Army on June 18, 1969. During  the Vietnam War, he was killed in Romeas Haek, Cambodia, for which his Distinguished Service Cross was posthumously upgraded to the Congressional Medal of Honor.

Medal of Honor 
U.S. Army Specialist 4 Ardie R. Copas distinguished himself on May 12, 1970, while serving as a machine gunner near Ph Romeas Hek, Cambodia. When his convoy was ambushed, Copas repelled the enemy under heavy fire, holding his post while his wounded comrades were evacuated. Copas was killed in action.

Copas' daughter Shyrell Jean Copas accepted the Medal of Honor on his behalf in a March 18, 2014 White House ceremony.

The award came through the Defense Authorization Act which called for a review of Jewish American and Hispanic American veterans from World War II, the Korean War and the Vietnam War to ensure that no prejudice was shown to those deserving the Medal of Honor.

Medal of Honor Citation 
'''

Other honors and decorations 
In addition to the Medal of Honor, Copas received the Bronze Star Medal with one Bronze Oak Leaf Cluster, Purple Heart, Army Good Conduct Medal, National Defense Service Medal, Vietnam Service Medal with two Bronze Service Stars, Combat Infantryman Badge, Expert Marksmanship Badge with Auto Rifle Bar, Republic of Vietnam Military Merit Medal, Republic of Vietnam Gallantry Cross with Palm Device, Republic of Vietnam Campaign Medal with "60" Device, Republic of Vietnam Gallantry Cross Unit Citation with Palm Device, Republic of Vietnam Civil Actions Honor Medal Unit Citation, First Class.

See also 
 List of Medal of Honor recipients for the Vietnam War

References 

1950 births
1970 deaths
American military personnel killed in the Vietnam War
United States Army Medal of Honor recipients
United States Army soldiers
Vietnam War recipients of the Medal of Honor
United States Army personnel of the Vietnam War
People from Fort Pierce, Florida